The CRH6 Hexie (simplified Chinese: 和谐号; traditional Chinese: 和諧號; pinyin: Héxié Hào; literally: "Harmony") is a regional/commuter high-speed train of the People's Republic of China. It is designed by CRRC Qingdao Sifang and will be manufactured by CRRC Nanjing Puzhen at its subsidiary, the CRRC Guangdong Jiangmen Factory.

Overview

The CRH6 will be divided into three major types, according to stopping patterns:

 CRH6A is the higher speed version with a designed top speed , top operating speed  to be used on regional non-stop or express services. It uses a 2+2 transverse seating layout using reversible seats that have a similar level of comfort and space to that of intercity trains. There is a toilet on cars 1, 3, 5, and 7.

 CRH6F is the High-speed rail version with a designed top speed , operating speed  to be used on express commuter services. It uses a 2+2 transverse seating layout with non-reversible seats that have a similar level of comfort and space to that of a suburban train. There is a toilet on cars 3 and 6.

 Metropolitan area EMU based on the Cinova intercity train platform (基于Cinova城际列车平台衍生的市域动车组) with a designed top speed , to be used on local commuter services. It will feature longitudinal seating arrangements similar to that of subway trains with more and larger doors for faster boarding and alighting.

On December 29, 2009, the MOR ordered 22 sets of  class and 10 sets of  class 6-car Intercity High Speed train from CRRC Puzhen, the contract worth 2346 million RMB, and now the order has been transformed into 24 sets of CRH6 and will be delivered by the end of 2012.

Formations

CRH6A

CRH6A-A

Lines served

CRH6
 Ningbo–Yuyao intercity railway
 Qinbei high-speed railway (Qinbei HSR) (钦北高速铁路)
 Shaoxing Tourism New Transit railway
 Dongguan–Huizhou intercity railway (Guanhui ICR)
 Changzhutan Intercity Railway
 Guangzhou–Zhuhai intercity railway (Guangzhu ICR)
 Jinshan Railway
 Sub-Central line of the Beijing Suburban Railway (The Sub-Central line uses the Beijing underground cross-city railway in the section between Beijing West railway station and Beijing railway station)
 Guangzhou–Shenzhen railway (Guangshen railway)
 Guangzhou–Shenzhen intercity railway (Suishen ICR)
 Zhengzhou–Xinzheng Airport intercity railway
 Zhengzhou–Kaifeng intercity railway
 Zhengzhou–Jiaozuo intercity railway
 Foshan–Dongguan intercity railway (Foguan ICR) (under construction)
 Guangzhou–Foshan circular intercity railway (Guangfo circular ICR) (under construction)

Metropolitan area EMU based on the Cinova intercity train platform

(Chinese: 基于Cinova城际列车平台衍生的市域动车组)
This type is no longer officially considered as a type of CRH6.
 Line S1 (Wenzhou Metro) (currently 4-car Type D. The line will use 6-car Type D in future.)
 Daxing Airport Express (currently 4-car and 8-car Type D.)

See also 
 China Railways CRH1
 China Railways CRH2
 China Railways CRH3
 China Railways CRH5
 China Railways CRH380A
 China Railways CIT Trains

References

External links

 Official CRH6 Model Train
 Photo of CRH6 trial run
 Interior photos of CRH6

High-speed trains
High-speed trains of China
25 kV AC multiple units
Electric multiple units of China
CRRC multiple units